The Tamil Nadu Women's League is the top division of women's football league in the Indian state of Tamil Nadu. The League is organised by the Tamil Nadu Football Association (TNFA), the official football governing body of the state.

History 

The state women's league was formulated during the tenure of Seeni Mohaideen, chairman of the women’s committee of the Tamil Nadu Football Association. The inaugural tournament was held in the 2019–20 season and was won by Sethu FC.

The matches are usually held at Jawaharlal Nehru Stadium in Chennai.

Media coverage 

The league matches are live-streamed on YouTube by Football Makka.

Clubs 

The teams which participated in the 2021–22 season:

Champions

See also 
 Football in India

References 

Women's football leagues in India
Football in Tamil Nadu
Sports leagues established in 2019